Lachnocnema pseudobibulus is a butterfly in the family Lycaenidae. It is found in Uganda, Kenya, Tanzania, the Democratic Republic of the Congo, Malawi and Zimbabwe.

References

Butterflies described in 1996
Taxa named by Michel Libert
Miletinae